Mohan Ukkrapandian (born 15 May 1986), known as Ukkra is an India men's national volleyball team player. He wears the jersey Number 16. Currently he plays for Calicut heroes ] in Prime Volleyball League.

Early life 
Ukkrapandian was born on  May 15, 1986 is from Pudupatti, Tamil Nadu.

Career
He is also a member of Tamil Nadu volleyball team. Because of his national level recognition, he was rewarded with a job in Indian Overseas Bank.

References

Living people
Indian men's volleyball players
Volleyball players at the 2010 Asian Games
Volleyball players at the 2014 Asian Games
Volleyball players at the 2018 Asian Games
1989 births
Volleyball players from Tamil Nadu
Asian Games competitors for India